Concrete bridges are a type of bridge, constructed out of concrete. They started to appear widely in the early 20th century. Early examples include:

History 
Regular concrete has been used for bridge construction since ancient times. The Frenchman Joseph Monier is considered to have invented reinforced concrete as a building material. In 1873 he received the patent on reinforced concrete bridge construction, with the first reinforced concrete bridge being constructed in 1875. This and all later bridges made according to Monier's system patterned the construction of previously used stone bridges. Their main structural unit was an arch barrel. All barrel sections were reinforced similarly regardless of the forces acting on it.
A classical example of cast concrete bridge on the site is the Waterloo Bridge built in London in 1928. It has two spans of 50 feet each and average spans of 110 feet. The world longest span made of regular concrete is the average span of the Rocky River Bridge in Cleveland, Ohio. It is 128 feet long. Now reinforced concrete with steel rods is mainly used and can be built much faster than stone and regular concrete arches.

Finland 
 
 Ylivieska (picture 1).
 The second oldest concrete bridge in Finland, built 1912 and named humorously as Savisilta (clay bridge) is located in Ylivieska. (picture 1).

United Kingdom 
 Glenfinnan Viaduct, Scotland (constructed 1897-1901)
 Seaton in Devon, England
  A concrete bridge that was built over the River Axe in 1877.

References 

 
Bridges